Ten Berge is a Dutch toponymic surname originally meaning "at the hill / mound". A much more common name with a similar meaning is Van den Berg. Ten Berge may refer to:

 H. C. ten Berge (born 1938), Dutch poet, prose writer, and translator
 Joey ten Berge (born 1985), Dutch darts player

References

Dutch-language surnames
Toponymic surnames